Grand Rapids FC was an American soccer club based in Grand Rapids, Michigan, whose senior men's team played in USL League Two.  The team was founded in 2014 and ceased operations in 2021. Its first season was in 2015.  It was initially funded by a group of supporters who purchased memberships to cover the operating expenses, as well as by local sponsors.

History
Grand Rapids FC (GRFC) was started by a group of Grand Rapids residents as a community-funded project along the lines of Nashville FC. Fundraising began on February 14, 2014, by word of mouth and was opened to the public a month later. The team applied to the National Premier Soccer League for the 2015 season but their application was denied. Instead, GRFC and AFC Ann Arbor (also denied an NPSL bid in 2015) founded the Great Lakes Premier League. The new league held its inaugural meeting on January 17, 2015, with six teams.

Following a 2015 season in which GRFC finished in second place, averaging 4,509 fans per game, the team announced on September 25, 2015, that they would leave the Great Lakes Premier League to join the National Premier Soccer League.

The 2016 season resulted in a first-place position in the NPSL Great Lakes West conference and qualification for the playoffs by beating AFC Ann Arbor in a 3–1 victory in front of a club record 6,854 spectators. The club reached the final of the NPSL Midwest Regional playoffs and beat Indy Eleven NPSL in front of a record attendance of 6,912, qualifying the team for the 2017 US Open Cup. The following day GRFC lost against 2016 NPSL champions AFC Cleveland on penalties.

On November 1, 2016, the club announced they would add a women's team under the same GRFC banner, which would begin play in 2017 in a new Midwest division of the United Women's Soccer league. The women's team plays at Grandville High School in Grandville, Michigan. The Grand Rapids FC (women) won the 2017 United Women's Soccer Championship in their inaugural season.

On December 5, 2019 it was announced that the club would be moving from the NPSL to USL League Two. Also during this time, the ownership of the women's side was transferred to Midwest United FC and their name was changed to reflect this change.

Grand Rapids FC ceased operations on October 27, 2021. The club cited that the lack of an adequate home venue and the financial challenges brought on by the COVID-19 pandemic forced the closure of the club.

Stadium

In 2020 and 2021, Grand Rapids FC had used the Midwest United FC Soccer Complex as their home field. Prior to 2020, Houseman Field in the Midtown neighborhood of Grand Rapids had been the home field since the club's inception.

Record attendance
 6,912 – July 22, 2016, vs Indy Eleven NPSL at Houseman Field (second game of a doubleheader, attendance counted both games)
 6,854 – July 8, 2016, vs AFC Ann Arbor at Houseman Field (single game record)

Head coaches
  George Moni (2015–2017)
  Lewis Robinson (2018–2019)
  James Gilpin (2020)
  Stuart Collins (2021)

Honors
National Premier Soccer League
 Conference championships (1)
 Midwest Region – Great Lakes West Conference: 2016
Minor competitions
 West Michigan Community Cup: 2020

Statistics

Year-by-year

Historic record vs opponents

 Note: Table includes all competitive matches and does not include friendlies.
 Updated to end of 2021 season.

Player records

Goals

Appearances

 Note: Table includes all competitive matches and does not include friendlies.
 Updated to end of 2021 season.
Reference:

Club culture

Supporters
The Grand Army was the supporters group for Grand Rapids FC. Starting in 2015, all pre-game festivities were held at Bob's Bar and a march led through the Midtown neighborhood. In June 2015 a fanzine entitled What if it Rains started publication. The name of the magazine referred to one of the reasons the NPSL originally declined the club's application and celebrated the club's massive support.

References

External links
 

Association football clubs established in 2014
Soccer clubs in Michigan
Sports in Grand Rapids, Michigan
National Premier Soccer League teams
2014 establishments in Michigan